Sverre Olaf Lie (born 27 February 1938, Oslo, died 8 March 2023) is a Norwegian pediatrician. He was head of the Pediatric Research Institute at University of Oslo from 1975 till 1989 and chairman and professor at the department of pediatrics at the National Hospital of Norway, Rikshospitalet from 1989 till 2006.

Early life 
Sverre Lie was born in Oslo. When he was four years old, his father Bjarne Lie lost his job as a lawyer due to problems with the Nazi authorities. The family moved to Sulitjelma, where Bjarne had got the post as office manager at the Sulitjelma Mines. The early years there were marked by the nazi occupation. His father was central in the local resistance movement (the leader of the local chapter of XU, a clandestine intelligence organisation), and there was a general scarcity. The family was gifted a barrel of herring from family in the south and they would have herring for dinner every day. In later life, he would never again eat herring! But Sulitjelma remained in his heart for other and more important reasons as well. The experience of social cohesion and thriving cultural life in spite of gross social inequities, and of an astonishing nature, would remain important reference points for him throughout his life. The years in Sultjelma also left physical traces. As a result of working in the mines as a teenager, he developed a hearing loss which worsened in later life. 

As there was no highschool in Sulitjelma, in 1954 he moved to Kongsvinger to live with friends of the family at Skansgården. He completed highschool in 1957, and played piano in the orchestra for the "russerevyen".

Education 
Partly motivated by the sudden death of his father in 1957, he started medical school that same year. He was fascinated by lectures by Kåre Jøssum, the first academic in Norway to do experimental researach in genetics. Intrigued by the recent discovery of the double helix, and by how it raised new questions of life and death, he asked to be Jøssum's assistant at Kaptein Wilhelmsens og Frues bakteriologiske institutt. In 1961, he received a scholarship to go to Rochester to study molecular genetics on microbes, and continued his research upon his return to Oslo. He finished medical school (MD) in 1965 at University of Oslo and one year later in 1966 received his PhD in molecular genetics with the title On the genetics of Neisseria menigitidis.

Professional and private life 
After completing medical school, he did his internship (turnus) in Moss Hospital and his district service in Senja. He then felt the privilege of having two opportunities - continuing his research career in genetics or working in the clinic. He chose the latter, and was never in doubht that the field should be paediatrics. While working in the paediatric department in Rikshospitalet, he immediately fell in love with a six year younger medical student named Kari Helene Elise Kveim upon meeting her in the hospital canteen in April 1967. They married on the 7th of December that same year, and spent their honeymoon in a Palestine refugee camp in Jordan, after Israelis had seizured the Westbank during the June war in 1967 and left many Palestinians homeless. Sverre established a mother and child health station there in 1967 and supervised this activity till 1975. International health would be important for him during his whole life. He was a member of an advisory board to Norad (Norwegian Agency for Development Cooperation) from 1973 to 1978 and worked to promote international engagement among his fellow paediatricians. 

From 1971-1972 he took his familiy, consisting of Kari and their two children (they would later get two more children) to Baltimore, where he was a visiting scientist at Johns Hopkins Hospital 1971-72 (with professor Victor A. McKusick), a man he would remain connected to throughout his career. He was recognized as a specialist in paediatrics in 1973 and specialist in medical genetics in 1975. 

In the early 1970s, inspired by recent developments in the US, he started aggressive treatment on children with acute lymphatic leucemia. Before that, mortality of this disease was almost 100%, and the introduction of aggressive treatment was controversial, as the side effects for the children were enormous. But the memory of the first patient that survived is still strong. She is still alive today and one of her children is named Sverre. 

In 1982, his colleague Lasse Åstrøm took the initiative to a first meeting for paediatricians interested in child oncology. That was the starting point for the Nordic Society for Pediatric Hematology and Oncology (NOPHO), cofounded by Sverre Lie. They shared clinical exprience and started doing clinical research, comparing clinical outcomes across the Nordic countries. Survival rates from myelogenic leucemia increased from almost  0 to 80% during these years. 

Increasingly, he was also active in SIOP, the international association for child oncology. From 1996-1999, after having served 4 years as a treasurer in the board, he was president of the association.

Post-retirement professional life 
After retiring, Sverre Lie changed career and started working in global health. He worked as a senior advisor to the prime minister of Norway in the field of maternal, newborn and child health from 2006 to 2010, and after that worked in the global health section of the Norwegian health directorate from 2008-2018. From 2018-2019 he was a consultant at NAKMI, the competence center of immigrants health. 

Sverre Lie has published more than 200 articles in journals and books and is co-author of several books.

Awards and honours
 Elected member of the Norwegian Academy of Science and Letters, 1993 and is elected member of the Children Cancer Study Group, UK and US.
 Awarded the 100-year anniversary prize of Norske Kvinners Sanitetsforening (Norwegian Woman’s Public Health Association) which is the biggest NGO in Norway, 1996.
 Elected "Professorem Hospitem" of the Universitas Carolina Pragensis (Charles University in Prague), 1996.
 Elected Honorary Member of the Royal College of Paediatrics and Child Health in Great Britain. The Royal College is a continuation of the British Paediatrics Association (BPA). Since 1928, when BPA was formed, only 4 paediatricians from the Nordic Countries have been given this honour. He is the only member from Norway. 1999.
 Ordered Knight, First Class of the Royal Norwegian Order of St. Olav by the Norwegian King, 2001.
 Elected as an Honorary Member of the Society of Scholars of the Johns Hopkins University, 2004, as first Norwegian
 Honorary member of Norwegian Paediatric Association, 2004
 Honorary member of Indian Academy of Pediatrics, 2004 
 Honorary member of the South African Children’s Cancer Study Group from 2010

References

1938 births
University of Oslo alumni
Norwegian pediatricians
Oslo University Hospital people
Members of the Norwegian Academy of Science and Letters
2023 deaths